Sky Sharks is a 2020 German science fiction comedy horror film directed by Marc Fehse and starring Robert LaSardo, Cary-Hiroyuki Tagawa, Lynn Lowry, Lar Park Lincoln, Nick Principe, Michaela Schaffrath and Charles Rettinghaus.

Plot 
During an expedition in Antarctica, a geological team accidentally discovers a Nazi laboratory from World War II that was kept hidden in the depths of the ice. A terrible secret weapon is hidden in the lab: an army of genetically modified sharks piloted by superhuman Nazi zombies. When they are awakened, they take to the skies, with terrible consequences for everything that crosses their path. An elite military group of four fallen US soldiers in Vietnam faces the threat to save the Earth from destruction.

Cast

Release
The film premiered at the London FrightFest Film Festival in August 2020.  It was released on DVD, Blu-ray and digital platforms on February 2, 2021.

Reception
The film has  rating on Rotten Tomatoes based on  reviews.

Martin Unsworth of Starburst awarded the film three stars and wrote, "Like the bastard son of Iron Sky and Dead Snow, Sky Sharks has Nazis at its heart, but in a way that allows the audience to have a little fun."

References

External links
 
 

2020 comedy horror films
2020 films
2020 science fiction horror films
2020s science fiction comedy films
German comedy horror films
German science fiction comedy films
German science fiction horror films
2020s German-language films